Rotundifolius m., Rotundifolia f. and Rotundifolium (Latin for round-leaved) may refer to several plant species including:

Berberis rotundifolia, a barberry species
Campanula rotundifolia, the harebell
 Combretum rotundifolium, the monkey brush, a plant species found in South America
Cissus rotundifolia, also known as Venezuelan treebine, Arabian wax leaf, Peruvian grape ivy
 Commidendrum rotundifolium, the bastard gumwood, a tree species endemic to the island of Saint Helena
Drosera rotundifolia, the round-leaved sundew or the common sundew, a sundew species
Eupatorium rotundifolium
Lavandula rotundifolia, a lavender species found in Cape Verde
Pellaea rotundifolia, the button fern, a popular house plant native to New Zealand
Plectranthus rotundifolius
Ribes rotundifolium
Saribus rotundifolius
Smilax rotundifolia
Viola rotundifolia, eastern roundleaf yellow violet or early yellow violet, a violet species
Vitis rotundifolia, the muscadine, a grapevine species

Synonyms
Abronia rotundifolia, synonym of Abronia umbellata
Alnus rotundifolia, synonym of Alnus cordata
Amaryllis rotundifolia, synonym of Proiphys amboinensis
Amelanchier rotundifolia, synonym of Amelanchier ovalis
Ancylobothrys rotundifolia, synonym of Ancylobothrys petersiana
Correa rotundifolia, synonym of Correa alba
Corypha rotundifolia, synonym of Saribus rotundifolius
Galax rotundifolia, synonym of Galax urceolata
Germanea rotundifolia, synonym of Plectranthus rotundifolius
Grossularia rotundifolia, synonym of Ribes rotundifolium
Livistona rotundifolia, synonym of Saribus rotundifolius
Mentha rotundifolia, synonym of Mentha suaveolens, the apple mint or the pineapple mint
Olea rotundifolia, synonym of Osmanthus heterophyllus
Quercus rotundifolia, synonym of Quercus ilex, an oak species
Uncasia rotundifolia, synonym of Eupatorium rotundifolium
Utricularia rotundifolia, synonym of Utricularia dichotoma